Cleon Orel "Cookie" Tackwell (January 14, 1907 – September 19, 1953) was an American football player.  He played professionally as an end and tackle for five seasons in the National Football League (NFL) with the Minneapolis Red Jackets, Frankford Yellow Jackets, Chicago Bears, Cincinnati Reds, and St. Louis Gunners.

References

External links

1907 births
1953 deaths
American football ends
American football tackles
Chicago Bears players
Cincinnati Reds (NFL) players
Frankford Yellow Jackets players
Kansas State Wildcats football players
Minneapolis Red Jackets players
St. Louis Gunners players
People from Phillips County, Kansas
Players of American football from Kansas